Goldie Colwell was an American film actress and journalist who starred in more than 80 films during Hollywood's silent era. She was Tom Mix's leading lady in many Selig westerns.

Biography 
Goldie was born in Tecumseh, Kansas, to John Colwell and Celia Pearson. The family eventually relocated to Los Angeles, where Goldie began working as an actress around 1911; her first credited role was in Joseph A. Golden and Tom Mix's Why the Sheriff Is a Bachelor.

She was employed at Selig as Tom Mix's leading lady in dozens of westerns before heading to David Horsley's Centaur Film Company, where she continued to take on starring roles.

After retiring from acting around 1919, she became a magazine editor, heading up a new publication called The Spotlight. She also wrote for The Pomona Bulletin and The Santa Ana Daily News.

After her first husband, George Diegel, died in 1933, she married Kenneth Harrell in 1935. Her niece, Vivien Fay, was an actress, dancer, and sculptor.

Selected filmography 

 The Railroader (1919)
 Code of the Yukon (1918)
 Jerry and the Vampire (1917)
 The Heart of Texas Ryan (1917)
 The Yaqui (1916)
 The Adventures of Kathlyn (1916)
 When Avarice Rules (1915)
 The Little Detective (1915)
 Taking a Chance (1915)
 A Change of Luck (1915)
 The Oriental Spasm (1915)
 The Treasure Box (1915)
 The Knockout (1915)
 He's in Again (1915)
 Ma's Girls (1915)
 Sage Brush Tom (1915)
 Cactus Jake, Heart-Breaker (1914)
 The Scapegoat (1914)
 The Ranger's Romance (1914)
 Why the Sheriff Is a Bachelor (1914)
 Carmelita's Revenge (1914)
 The Cruel Crown (1914)
 The Adventures of Kathlyn (1913)
 Our Lady of the Pearls (1912)
Why the Sheriff Is a Bachelor (1911)

References

External link
Goldie Colwell IMDb

American film actresses
19th-century births
1982 deaths
Actresses from Kansas